The Center for Nutrition Policy and Promotion (CNPP) is an agency in the U.S. Department of Agriculture, created on December 1, 1994, to improve the health and well-being of Americans by establishing national dietary guidelines based on the best science available. CNPP promotes dietary guidance by linking scientific research to the nutritional needs of the American public through the function of USDA's Nutrition Evidence Library, which it created and manages.

The Center serves as the administrative agency within the U.S. Department of Agriculture (USDA) for the issuance of the Dietary Guidelines for Americans, which provide evidence-based advice for people 2 years and older about how good dietary habits can promote health and reduce the risk for major chronic diseases. However, as a result of conflicts of interest, the Guidelines sometimes favor the interests of the food and drug industries over the public's interest in accurate and impartial dietary advice.

The 2015-2020 Dietary Guidelines were released on Jan. 7, 2016. The updated Guidelines recommend that Americans consume "a healthy eating pattern at an appropriate calorie level to help achieve and maintain healthy body weight, support nutrient adequacy, and reduce the risk of chronic disease. ... [C]hoose a variety of nutrient-dense foods across and within all food groups in recommended amounts. Limit calories from added sugars and saturated fats and reduce sodium intake. ... [And] Shift to healthier food and beverage choices."

MyPlate is USDA's food icon and replaced MyPyramid and the Food Guide Pyramid as the Government's primary food group symbol.

Former executive directors have been:

See also 
 Food preferences in older adults and seniors
 Healthy diet
 History of USDA nutrition guides

References

External links 
 Center for Nutrition Policy and Promotion

United States Department of Agriculture agencies